Ray Beaven (1936−2018) was an Australian professional rugby league footballer who played in the 1950s and 1960s. He played for the Eastern Suburbs, Canterbury Bulldogs and for the Australian national side.

Beaven began his rugby league career with Eastern Suburbs in Australia's leading competition, the New South Wales Rugby League (NSWRL) in 1958. Beaven, a five-eighth or centre, played 10 matches for the Roosters.

In 1960 Beaven moved to the rural NSW township of Tumut where he played for the local side. In 1961 Beaven was selected to represent NSW in 2 interstate matches against Queensland and later that year gained selection for the Australian national side for its tour of New Zealand.

He returned to the NSWRL in 1962, where he captained Canterbury-Bankstown to a Pre-Season Cup final.

References

External links
Bulldogs profile

1936 births
2018 deaths
Australian rugby league players
Canterbury-Bankstown Bulldogs players
Rugby league players from Yass, New South Wales
Sydney Roosters players